Albert Arnz (24 January 1832 – 9 September 1914) was a German landscape painter of the Düsseldorf school.

Biography 
Albert Arnz was the son of Maria Catharina Carolina and Heinrich Arnz (1785–1854), a well-known bookseller and printer (he owned Arnz & Comp.). He studied painting from 1854 to 1860 at the Kunstakademie Düsseldorf, there two of his teachers were Andreas and Oswald Achenbach. The latter married Arnz's sister Julie (born 1827), and with him he traveled to Italy a number of times. Another brother in law, the husband of his sister Marie Anna Fernandine (born 1829), was the Düsseldorfer painter Albert Flamm. Yet another brother in law, husband of Arnz's oldest sister Marie (born 1825), was the historical painter Joseph Fay. Arnz's brother August (born 1813) was the manager of the Arnz & Comp. location in Leiden until his death in 1846; his brother Carl (born 1821) was likewise a location manager for the company, while his brother Otto (born 1823) became a landscape painter like Albert, but oriented more toward realism. Finally, Friedrich (born 1826) married Antonetta Josepha, the sister of Düsseldorfer portrait and genre painter Philipp Schmitz (1824–1887), in 1851. Combined driver Benno von Achenbach and naval engineer Oswald Flamm were nephews of Arnz.

Arnz was a member of the art society Malkasten and participated in their tableaux vivants beginning in 1875. He lived at Schadowstraße 52, the location where in 1900 the Jugendstil-styled Ibach-Haus was built.

Selected works

Arnz painted landscapes of Germany, Italy, and Switzerland. His paintings show his membership of the Düsseldorfer Schule, and many show a kinship with his teacher Oswald Achenbach, especially in their effective treatment of light and color.

 Blick auf die Burg Regenstein im Harz
 Schweizer Landschaft
 Waldlandschaft mit Schafherde
 Ruinen des alten Rom, 1869
 Das Kolosseum
 Strand bei Neapel, 1871
 Heimkehrende Langhornrinder in der Campagna Romana (Abendstimmung), 1879
 Der Venustempel von Baiae am Golf von Neapel, 1897
 Engelsbrücke in Rom mit Engelsburg und Petersdom, 1902

Literatur 
 Hermann Alexander Müller: Biographisches Künstler-Lexikon. Verlag des Bibliographischen Instituts, Leipzig 1882, S. 19 (Digitalisat)
 Hans Wolfgang Singer (ed.): Allgemeines Künstler-Lexikon. Sechster Band, zweiter Nachtrag mit Berichtigungen, Literarische Anstalt Rütten & Loening, Frankfurt am Main 1922, S. 3  (Digitalisat)
 Friedrich von Boetticher: Malerwerke des 19. Jahrhunderts. I/1, Dresden 1891, S. 40, Nr. 8  
 Adolf Rosenberg: Geschichte der modernen Kunst. Volume 2: Die deutsche Kunst. F. W. Grunow, Leipzig 1894, p. 1

References

External links

 Albert Arnz on arcadja.com
 Albert Arnz on artnet

1832 births
1914 deaths
German landscape painters
Place of birth missing
Kunstakademie Düsseldorf alumni
19th-century German painters
German male painters
20th-century German painters
20th-century German male artists
19th-century German male artists